Metric conversion may refer to:
 Converting a non-metric quantity to the metric equivalent; see "Conversion of units"
 Conversion of a country from non-metric units to metric units; see "Metrication"